Eisa Shaaban (born 6 June 1985) is a Qatari footballer for Mesaimeer .

References

External links
 

Qatari footballers
1985 births
Living people
Al-Wakrah SC players
Al-Sailiya SC players
Umm Salal SC players
Mesaimeer SC players
Qatar Stars League players
Qatari Second Division players
Association football goalkeepers